24th Reconnaissance Squadron may refer to:
 The 24th Expeditionary Reconnaissance Squadron, designated the 24th Reconnaissance Squadron from July 1992 to June 1994
 The 414th Expeditionary Reconnaissance Squadron, designated the 24th Reconnaissance Squadron (Heavy) from February 1942 to April 1942.
 The 24th Tactical Air Support Squadron, designated the 24th Reconnaissance Squadron, Very Long Range (Photographic - Radar Countermeasures) from July 1947 to June 1949
 The 24th Intelligence Squadron, designated the 24th Reconnaissance Squadron (Bombardment) from April 1943 to August 1943.

See also
 The 24th Strategic Reconnaissance Squadron, Medium, active from January 1951 to June 1952
 The 24th Strategic Reconnaissance Squadron, active from March 1967 to July 1992